Torino Calcio enjoyed its most successful season in the 1990s, finishing third in the extremely competitive Serie A, plus nearly added the UEFA Cup to the trophy room, only missing out on away goals against Dutch side Ajax in the two-legged final.

Squad

Goalkeepers
  Luca Marchegiani
  Raffaele Di Fusco
  Luca Pastine

Defenders
  Enrico Annoni
  Silvano Benedetti
  Pasquale Bruno
  Roberto Cravero
  Roberto Mussi
  Gianluca Sordo

Midfielders
  Marco Bertelli
  Giuseppe Carillo
  Sandro Cois
  Luca Fusi
  Gianluigi Lentini
  Rafael Martín Vázquez
  Roberto Policano
  Enzo Scifo
  Marco Sinaglia
  Giorgio Venturin

Attackers
   Mario Perinelli
  Giorgio Bresciani
  Walter Casagrande
  Christian Vieri

Competitions

Serie A

League table

Matches

Topscorers
  Enzo Scifo 9
  Walter Casagrande 6
  Gianluigi Lentini 5
  Roberto Policano 5
  Giorgio Bresciani 4

Coppa Italia 

Second round

Eightfinals

Quarterfinals

UEFA Cup 

Second round

Third round

Eightfinals

Quarterfinals

Semifinals

Final

References

Sources
  RSSSF - Italy 1991/92

Torino F.C. seasons
Torino